People's Power is a Georgian political movement founded by Georgian MPs Sozar Subari, Mikheil Kavelashvili and Dimitri Khundadze, after they left the ruling Georgian Dream.

History 
The movement was founded on 2 August 2022. The founders of the movement said that they remain in agreement with the Georgian Dream on core values, but had tactical differences from Georgian Dream. According to them, the main goal of the movement will be to "bring to the public more truth that is hidden behind the scenes of Georgian politics". 

As of October 2022, 9 deputies had already joined the movement, depriving the Georgian Dream of its parliamentary majority. The deputies in People's Power decided to remain in the ruling majority, supporting the government.

The movement has notably criticized the United States foreign policy in Georgia. In a number of public letters, its members have questioned US funding for Georgia, saying that it only served to strengthen American interests in Georgia at the expense of Georgia's state institutions and sovereignty. It has accused the United States Embassy of interfering in the country's internal affairs and undermining the Georgian judiciary. The movement has accused a number of Georgian political parties (including the largest opposition party, United National Movement) and NGOs of being American agents. The movement has accused the USAID of "attacking Georgia's sovereignty" and "trying to subjugate the Georgian judiciary to foreign control".

Political positions

The movement supports limiting foreign funding of the NGOs to curb foreign influence. It claims to defend Georgia's sovereignty from external influences and has been described as sovereigntist.

Seats in Municipal assemblies

References

2022 establishments in Georgia (country)
Political parties established in 2022
Political parties in Georgia (country)
Parties related to the Party of European Socialists